José Bleger (1922–1972) was an Argentine psychiatrist. In his work, he focussed on the concept of symbiosis and ambiguity. He also sought a rapprochement of psychoanalysis and marxism in works such as Psychoanalysis and materialist dialectics.

Work

Clinical 
He was a huge contributor to the concept of symbiosis. He has described forty-two characteristics of symbiosis.

Political 
Bleger also worked on Marxism and political theory.

Bibliography 
 Teoría y práctica del narcoanálisis, 1952
 Psicohigiene y psicología institucional
 Simbiosis y ambiguedad. Estudio psicoanalitico
 Psicoanálisis y dialéctica materialista : estudios sobre la estructura del psicoanálisis
 Temas de psicología : entrevista y grupo
 Psicología de la conducta

References

1923 births
1972 deaths
Argentine psychiatrists